Science Foo Camp (scifoo) is an annual of interdisciplinary scientific unconferences organized by O'Reilly Media, Digital Science, Alphabet Inc., based on an idea from Linda Stone. The event is based on the spirit and format of Foo Camp, an event focused on emerging technology, and is designed to encourage collaboration between scientists who would not typically work together. As such, it is unusual among conferences in three ways:

 attendance is by invitation-only
 the delegates come from many different areas of science rather than one subject, such as physics, chemistry or biology
 the meeting has no fixed agenda; the invited scientists, technologists and policy makers set the conference program during the conference itself, based on their shared professional interests and enthusiasms, aka unconference

The first event in 2006 was held under the Chatham House Rule.  The policy at the second event was to allow open reporting by default; attendees were expected to indicate if their comments were off the record.  Science Foo Camp has taken place annually at the Googleplex campus in Mountain View, California, United States.

Organization
 scifoo is organized by

 Tim O'Reilly and Marsee Henon of O'Reilly Media (FOO stands for "Friends of O'Reilly")
  Daniel Hook of Digital Science
 Magdalena Skipper of Nature
 Cat Allman of Google

Previously Timo Hannay and Chris DiBona were also hosts and organisers. In 2021 the organizers of Sci Foo released a series of 5-minute lightning talks from alumni on YouTube and a twelve-minute video made at SciFoo 2009 is also available.

Previous events 
Science Foo Camp has run every year since 2006:
 August 2006.
 August 2007
 August 2008
 July 2009
 July 2010
 August 2011
 August 2012
 June 2013
 August 2014
 June 2015
 July 2016
 August 2017
 June 2018
 July 2019We Are Getting Ready for SciFoo! - 10 July 2019
 October 2020
 Sci Foo Alumni Lightning Talks (online) May 13–15, 2021
 October 2021

References 

Unconferences
O'Reilly Media
Recurring events established in 2006
2006 establishments in California